Terraria is an action-adventure sandbox game developed by Re-Logic. The game was first released for Windows on May 16, 2011, and has since been ported to several other platforms. The game features exploration, crafting, building, painting, and combat with a variety of creatures in a procedurally generated 2D world. Terraria received generally positive reviews and sold over 44 million copies by 2022, making it one of the top ten best-selling video games.

Gameplay 

Terraria is a 2D sandbox game with gameplay that revolves around exploration, building, crafting, combat, survival, and mining, playable in both single-player and multiplayer modes. The game has a 2D sprite tile-based graphical style reminiscent of the 16-bit sprites found on the Super NES. The game is noted for its classic exploration-adventure style of gameplay, similar to games such as the Metroid series and Minecraft.

The game starts in a procedurally generated world, with players starting out with basic tools and a non-player character (NPC) guide to get them started and bring their attention to aspects of the game and progression. The game's world is made up of several layers of tiles that players can interact with and modify. Many resources, such as metal ores, can be found while exploring caves. Players begin with low health and mana, which can be increased by finding and crafting specific items. Some resources may only be found in specific areas of the map, stored in common and rare containers, or dropped by certain enemies. Players use resources to craft new items and equipment. Different recipes require different resources and crafting stations. Several items in Terraria create complex crafting trees involving a large amount of items to create a single powerful piece of equipment.

Players have the option to customize their character's appearance when creating a new character, and in-game by visiting the Stylist NPC or the Clothier NPC. Along with that, players can obtain vanity items, which are special armor pieces and accessories with only a cosmetic effect, and dyes to change the color of equipped armor or accessories. Characters have three inventory slots for armor to be equipped, and several inventory slots for various accessories to provide a boost to a player's statistics, such as wings or water walking boots, as well as vanity slots for all of them, allowing them to be hidden behind cosmetics while retaining their effects. Much like most Terraria items, armor and accessories can be crafted, found around the world, and obtained from defeating bosses.

Players can encounter many different types of enemies in Terraria, the occurrence of which depends on several factors including time, location, and random events. The game features an open-ended class system, primarily divided into melee, ranged, magic and summoner classes. Players may also battle bosses that utilize a number of different combat mechanics and can drop rare and valuable items. Bosses are summoned by using certain items or when certain criteria are met. The defeat of some bosses is directly tied to in-game progression, while others remain optional. Defeating the Wall of Flesh boss advances the game into "hardmode", which adds many new enemies throughout the world, as well as new NPCs and items. Like bosses, players can battle special enemies and mini bosses during invasions, in which enemies appear constantly and they either must be defeated or a certain amount of time must pass before the event ends. Terraria also features seasonal events which activate during certain periods of the real world calendar year, adding new enemies and content.

By completing specific goals, such as defeating a boss or obtaining a certain item, players can attract NPCs to occupy structures or rooms they have built, such as a merchant, nurse, or wizard. Some NPCs can be acquired by finding them throughout the world and will then reside in player-created houses after being rescued. Players may then buy or sell items and certain services from NPCs with coins obtained from defeating enemies and bosses. The game features many different biomes and areas, which are each home to a unique set of enemies and challenges. The Corruption, Crimson, and the hardmode-exclusive Hallow, will expand by slowly overtaking and converting nearby blocks. NPCs prefer to be around certain biomes and with certain other NPCs, and will raise and lower their prices and sell special items depending on if they are sufficiently happy.

"Expert" and "Master mode" are difficulty modes that increase the challenge of the game in exchange for some exclusive items. "Journey" mode allows players to duplicate items, adjust the world's difficulty, and control weather and time at will while playing.

Terraria has support for mods, which is facilitated by the third-party tModLoader. It later received official support when it was released as free downloadable content alongside the "Journey's End" update on Steam in 2020. Mods for Terraria vary widely in their scope, content, and purpose. Some, such as Thorium and Calamity, add new content to the game, including new bosses, weapons, and biomes. Some, such as Overhaul, rework the mechanics of the game to provide players with a different experience. Some, such as Recipe Browser, Veinminer, and Fargo's Mutant Mod, aim to improve quality of life by streamlining parts of the game.

Development and release 

Development of Terraria began in January 2011 by Re-Logic, built on the Microsoft XNA framework and written in C Sharp. Re-Logic was composed of Andrew Spinks, who designed and programmed the game; Finn Brice, who, along with Spinks, did the graphic design for the game. The music was composed by Scott Lloyd Shelly. The game was released for Windows on May 16, 2011. In December 2011, the game was updated to version 1.1, adding new monsters, bosses, NPCs, and items. The update also included improvements to the game's world generation technology and lighting system. In February 2012, the developers announced that they would not continue development but would release a final bug-fix patch. However, development resumed in 2013 with Spinks asking the community for ideas to include in future content updates.

In September 2012, Spinks announced that Engine Software and 505 Games would be porting Terraria to Xbox 360 and PlayStation 3. The game was released for Xbox 360 via Xbox Live Arcade on March 27, 2013. The PlayStation 3 version was released via the PlayStation Network in North America on March 26, 2013 and in Europe and Australia on May 15, 2013. Shortly after the initial console release, 505 Games announced Terraria for PlayStation Vita; it was released in Europe on December 11, 2013, and in North America on December 17, 2013. Spike Chunsoft localized the PlayStation 3 and Vita versions for release in Japan, including exclusive items such as a costume based on Monokuma from their Danganronpa series. In May 2013, 505 Games announced a mobile version of Terraria ported by Dutch studio Codeglue for Android, iOS, and Windows Phone. It was released for iOS on August 29, 2013, and for Android on September 13, 2013. The Windows Phone version was released on September 12, 2014.

In October 2013, Re-Logic released version 1.2 for Terraria on Windows. The update added a host of new mechanics, gameplay changes, and graphics adjustments. After the 1.2 update was released the game returned to receiving continuous updates. The console and mobile versions received the update in 2014. Terraria released on GOG.com on October 2, 2014. A downloadable version of Terraria was released for PlayStation 4 on November 11, 2014, and Xbox One on November 14, 2014, with a retail release on December 2, 2014. In September 2014, Re-Logic announced that Terraria would be coming to macOS and Linux. They were both released on August 12, 2015. The Nintendo 3DS version was first released on the Nintendo eShop on December 10, 2015. A Wii U version was released on the eShop in June 2016.

Version 1.3 was released on June 30, 2015, adding even more items, events, enemies, bosses, and gameplay features. The update was released for consoles on December 12, 2017, and was released for mobile on August 27, 2019. In July 2016, 505 Games announced that Engine Software and Codeglue would no longer be working on the console and mobile versions respectively and that a new studio, Pipeworks, would take over the development of those versions. A version for the Nintendo Switch, ported by 505 Games, was released on June 27, 2019. In December 2018, 505 Games announced that development of the 1.3 update for mobile would be taken over by DR Studios to help Pipeworks focus on the Switch port of the game. In August 2020, Re-Logic announced that development of the Console and Switch would be taken over by DR Studios.

The fourth and final major update for the game, Journey's End, was released on May 16, 2020, the ninth anniversary of the game's initial release. As with previous updates, it added new items, enemies, difficulty modes, and gameplay features.

In February 2021, Spinks announced the cancellation of the Stadia port of Terraria due to the suspension of the Re-Logic/Spinks's Google account without a given reason for over three weeks. He also announced that Re-Logic would not be working with Google again in the future stating, "I will not be involved with a corporation that values their customers and partners so little. Doing business with Google is a liability." He later clarified that existing Android and Google Play versions of the game will not be affected. Later that February, Google reached out to Re-Logic about the account shutdown and provided transparency around the situation and restored their accounts, and subsequently, Re-Logic reaffirmed that they still planned to release the game for Stadia, which it did on March 18, 2021.

A March 2021 update for the Steam version of the game added direct support for resource packs, worlds, and character sharing through the Steam Workshop. tModLoader is still used to help provide and install user-created mods for the game. In November 2021, a crossover update added content from the survival game Don't Starve Together, which received its own Terraria-themed content in return. An update known as "Labor of Love" was released on September 28, 2022.

Cancelled sequels 
In October 2013, Spinks announced that he was planning Terraria 2, stating that it would be significantly different from the original game. Terraria: Otherworld, announced in February 2015, was another game that was set be released later that year. Otherworld tasked the player with trying to purify the world of the Corruption, which was to be achieved mainly by finding and activating "purifying towers" that push back the spread of the Corruption. Otherworld would have included more strategy and role-playing elements, such as a tower defense gameplay element, skill trees, and a plot. In April 2017, Re-Logic announced that the previous partner on the project, Engine Software, would be dropped in favor of a new studio, Pipeworks, due to the game being behind schedule. A year later, Re-Logic announced that Otherworld had been cancelled due to them not being satisfied with its development.

Reception 

Terraria received generally favorable reviews from critics, according to review aggregator Metacritic. A review for Destructoid included praise for Terraria as "full of depth". Another reviewer praised Terraria integration of some of Minecraft concepts into two dimensions. GameSpot praised Terraria exploration and feeling of accomplishment but criticized its lack of tutorial or explicit directions. IGN praised the game, claiming that Terraria: "expands on the familiar sandbox gameplay with a greater emphasis on combat and adventure." Terraria received the #1 of 2011 Indie of the Year Player Choice on IndieDB. Terraria has been described as a Minecraft clone by various video gaming media outlets.

Terraria sold 200,000 copies in just over a week after its release, and over 432,000 within a month. By May 2022, over 44.5 million copies of Terraria had been sold, making it one of the best-selling video games of all time. The total is split between 23 million on PC, 12.4 million on mobile, and 9.1 million on console.

Notes

References

External links 

 
 Official wiki

2011 video games
Action-adventure games
Android (operating system) games
Construction and management simulation games
Indie video games
IOS games
Linux games
MacOS games
Microsoft XNA games
Multiplayer and single-player video games
Nintendo 3DS eShop games
Nintendo 3DS games
Nintendo Network games
Nintendo Switch games
Open-world video games
PlayStation 3 games
PlayStation 4 games
PlayStation Network games
PlayStation Vita games
Stadia games
Video games with Steam Workshop support
Survival video games
Video games developed in the United States
Video games featuring protagonists of selectable gender
Video games using procedural generation
Video games with cross-platform play
Wii U eShop games
Wii U games
Windows games
Windows Phone games
Xbox 360 games
Xbox 360 Live Arcade games
Xbox Cloud Gaming games
Xbox One games
505 Games games
Headup Games games
Engine Software games
DR Studios games